Alexander "Sasha" Yevtushenko (born 31 January 1979) is a director and producer of radio dramas for  BBC Radio. He is a son of Russian poet Yevgeny Yevtushenko and his third wife, English translator Jan Butler.

In 2016 an adaptation of Mikhail Bulgakov's The Master and Margarita produced by Yevtushenko won the BBC Audio Drama Award in the Best Adaptation category. In 2018, Katie Hims' Black Eyed Girls, which he directed, won the BBC Audio Drama Award for Best Series/Serial.

Selected works
As director:
 The Problem of Cell 13 (2011)
 The Count of Monte Cristo (2012, directed by Jeremy Mortimer and Sasha Yevtushenko)
 Lord of the Flies (2013)
 Do Androids Dream of Electric Sheep? (2014)
 Agamemnon (2014)
 The Furies (2014)
 The Voyage of the Damned (2020,  audio adaptation starring Toby Jones, Paul Ritter, Allan Corduner and Philip Glenister. Based upon the book by Gordon Thomas and Max Morgan-Witts. )

As producer:
 The Master and Margarita (2015)

References

External links
 
 

BBC Radio drama directors
BBC radio producers
British radio producers
Living people
1979 births
British people of Belarusian descent
British people of Russian descent
British people of Polish descent